Werner Schley (born 25 January 1935 – 30 May 2007) was a Swiss footballer who played as a goalkeeper during the 1950s and 1960s. Schley was born in Basel and he died whilst he was in Mallorca, Spain.

Football career

Club career
Schley played his youth football with Nordstern Basel and advanced to their first team in 1951. At that time they played in the  Nationalliga B, the second tier of Swiss football. In that season Schley played between the posts in 16 of the 26 games, but could not save the team from suffering relegation.

Schley then joined FC Basel for their 1952–53 season with club legend René Bader as player-manager. After playing in five test matches, Schley played his domestic league debut for his new club in the away game on 31 August 1952 as Basel drew 2–2 with Young Boys. At the end of the season Schley had played in 19 of the league games and the team won their very first league title in 1953.

In 1953 Schley then signed for Grasshopper Club Zürich, but returned to FC Basel after just one season. Between the years 1952 to 1953 and again from 1954 to 1957 Schley played a total of 129 games for Basel. 86 of these games were in the Nationalliga A, ten in the Swiss Cup and 33 were friendly games.

In the summer of 1958 Schley then signed for FC Zürich and he remained there for seven years before he retired in 1965.

International experience
Schley earned three caps for the Swiss national team, making his international debut in a 1–5 defeat against Yugoslavia on 25 April 1959 in Basel. His last appearance was in a 3–1 win over the Netherlands in Zürich on 18 May 1960.

Coaching career
After his active football career, Schley coached Grasshopper during the 1966–67 Nationalliga A season together with Werner Brunner. Although they were replaced by Skiba the following season, both were reactivated for the 1969–70 Nationalliga A season. Schley later coached FC Luzern and FC Winterthur.

Titles and honours
Basel
 Swiss League Champion: 1952–53

Zürich
 Swiss League Champion: 1962–63

See also
 List of FC Basel players
 List of FC Basel seasons
 Football in Switzerland

Notes

References

Sources 
 Rotblau: Jahrbuch Saison 2017/2018. Publisher: FC Basel Marketing AG. 
 Die ersten 125 Jahre. Publisher: Josef Zindel im Friedrich Reinhardt Verlag, Basel. 
 Verein "Basler Fussballarchiv" Homepage
 1952–53 at RSSSF

External links
 

1935 births
2007 deaths
Swiss men's footballers
Switzerland international footballers
FC Basel players
Grasshopper Club Zürich players
FC Zürich players
Swiss football managers
FC Luzern managers
Grasshopper Club Zürich managers
FC Winterthur managers
Association football goalkeepers
Footballers from Basel